Sarduiyeh Rural District is a rural district (dehestan) in Sarduiyeh District, Jiroft County, Kerman Province, Iran. At the 2006 census, its population was 12,594, in 2,326 families. The rural district has 98 villages.

References 

Rural Districts of Kerman Province
Jiroft County